The International Accreditation Forum, Inc. (IAF) is the world association of Conformity Assessment Accreditation bodies and other bodies interested in conformity assessment in the fields of management systems, products, services, personnel and other similar programs of conformity assessment. Its primary function is to develop a single worldwide program of conformity assessment which reduces risk for business and its customers by assuring them that accredited certificates may be relied upon.

IAF members accredit certification or registration bodies that issue certificates attesting that an organization's management, products or personnel comply with a specified standard.

Accreditation is an essential ingredient for competitiveness, access to new markets, productivity improvement, innovation of new products and environmental protection, as well as the health and safety of populations. An efficient and effective quality and standards infrastructure, underpinned by accreditation, is key to a country’s growth, as well as being essential in creating a safer, cleaner, and more equitable and well-integrated world.
Accreditation provides confidence in the quality, safety, and environmental credentials of goods, services, and processes. It is required for the effective operation of domestic markets, and its international recognition is important to enable access to foreign markets. Accreditation is a critical element in promoting and sustaining economic development as well as environmental and social well-being, as it provides confidence in metrology, standardization, and conformity assessment (which comprises testing, calibration, inspection, and certification).

IAF has prepared an informative brochure which provides general information about IAF, its activities, membership and programs.

Role of the IAF

The primary purpose of IAF is two-fold. Firstly, to ensure that its accreditation body members only accredit bodies that are competent to do the work they undertake and are not subject to conflicts of interest. The second purpose of the IAF is to establish mutual recognition arrangements (MRAs), known as Multilateral Recognition Arrangements (MLAs), between its accreditation body members which reduces risk to business and its customers by ensuring that an accredited certificate may be relied upon anywhere in the world. The MLA contributes to the freedom of world trade by eliminating technical barriers to trade. IAF works to find the most effective way of achieving a single system that will allow companies with an accredited conformity assessment certificate in one part of the world, to have that certificate recognized elsewhere in the world. The objective of the MLA is that it will cover all accreditation bodies in all countries in the world, thus eliminating the need for suppliers of products or services to be certified in each country where they sell their products or services.

According to the World Bank, accreditation and the wider quality infrastructure, serve the needs of governments, businesses, and consumers. For governments, it provides a mechanism to support relevant trade and industrial policies and ensures enforcement of mandatory technical regulations. Further information can be found on Public Sector Assurance. For businesses, it helps limit the cost of production, by increasing productivity and enabling firms to be more competitive in domestic and foreign markets. More information can be found on Business Benefits. For consumers, it ensures public health and safety as well as environmental and consumer protection. 
Accreditation is closely linked to the United Nations goals of promotion of sustainable development, to protection of human rights, and advancing economic prosperity. The work of ILAC and IAF is strongly aligned to key projects of UNIDO and UNECE, which promote the adoption of accreditation to facilitate trade, provide employment opportunities, and to facilitate exports and foreign direct investment.
Maintaining strategic partnerships and technical cooperation, together with the use of standards and compliance related activities, forms an important part of UNIDO’s approach. The relationship between UNIDO, the IAF and ILAC aims to enhance the impact of industrial development on economic growth and achieving the SDGs.

IAF CertSearch

IAF launched IAF CertSearch so accredited certifications from around the world can be validated. IAF CertSearch is a global database where users can search and validate the status of accredited certification issued by a Certification Body which has been accredited by an IAF signatory member Accreditation Body.
IAF CertSearch also provides organisations with information about the accredited network, which includes a list of all Accreditation Bodies and Certification Bodies across the globe.

•	Organisations seeking to become certified can browse a list of accredited Certification Bodies here.

•	Organisations seeking accreditation can browse a list of Accreditation Bodies here.

•	Organisations seeking to trade with a certified company can browse companies on the voluntary trade marketplace here.

Structure of the IAF

The highest level of authority in IAF is the Members in a General Meeting. General Meetings make decisions and lay down policy in the name of the members. The Board is responsible for legal actions to be carried out on behalf of the members, for developing broad policy directions for IAF and for ensuring that the day-to-day work of the IAF is carried out in accordance with policies approved by members. The terms of reference, tasks and duties as defined by the Bylaws and the Memorandum of Understanding (MoU) remain unchanged for the members at a General Meeting, the Board of Directors and the Secretary. The Executive Committee is responsible to the Board of Directors for the day-to-day work of IAF on the basis of decisions made by the Members and directions by the Board of Directors. The operations of all IAF Committees and Subordinate Groups, including the Executive Committee, are subject to the IAF General Procedures.

Membership
The International Accreditation Forum is a global association of Accreditation Bodies, Conformity Assessment Body associations, Regional Accreditation Groups, and Industry associations, including scheme owners. 
  Accreditation Body Membership: Open to Bodies developing, or conducting and administering, accreditation of entities that perform conformity assessment such as management system certification, product certification, certification of persons, verification/validation, or similar conformity assessment.
  Regional Accreditation Group Membership: Open to regional groups of Accreditation Bodies whose aims include the maintenance of Regional Multilateral Recognition Arrangements recognising the equal reliability and/or equivalence of their members’ accreditations.
An official list is available online.

World Accreditation Day
The IAF and the International Laboratory Accreditation Cooperation (ILAC), the global associations for accreditation with members from 103 economies, established World Accreditation Day to take place each year on June 9 to act as a springboard for awareness-raising actions and to promote accreditation to governments, the public and private sectors, and, more generally, citizens. It also provides national organisations the opportunity to organize activities related to the theme of the day. 
World accreditation days since 2009

See also
IAF MLA

External links
 Accreditation Auditing Practices Group
 International Accreditation Forum
 IAF Newsletter

References

 

International professional associations
International standards organizations